Computers for Schools may refer to:
Computers for Schools (Canada), a Canadian program founded in 1993
Computers for Schools, a scheme operated by the British retailer Tesco

See also
Computers for African Schools (UK)
Computer technology for developing areas
Computers in the classroom
Educational technology